M-221 is a short state trunkline highway in the Upper Peninsula (UP) of the US state of Michigan that connects M-28 with the community of Brimley and Brimley State Park. The highway was originally part of M-28 until the 1940s when it was briefly a local road. It has been a state highway again since it was designated as M-221 in 1945.

Route description
The highway passes through rural fields and woods until it enters downtown. At the corner of Main Street and Lakeshore Drive, the signed portion of M-221 ends, but state maintenance continues on Lakeshore Drive across the Waiska River.

M-221 is maintained by the Michigan Department of Transportation (MDOT) like other state highways in Michigan. As a part of these maintenance responsibilities, the department tracks the volume of traffic that uses the roadways under its jurisdiction. These volumes are expressed using a metric called annual average daily traffic, which is a statistical calculation of the average daily number of vehicles on a segment of roadway. MDOT's surveys in 2009 showed that the traffic levels along M-221 were 2,940 vehicles daily north of the junction with 7½ Mile Road and 1,476 vehicles per day south of the intersection; along the whole highway, 26 trucks were recorded in the survey. No sections of M-221 have been listed on the National Highway System, a network of roads important to the country's economy, defense, and mobility.

History
M-221 was part of the original M-25 that ran through the eastern UP in 1919. This specific segment of roadway ran north into Brimley and turned east onto 6 Mile Road to connect with US Highway 2 (now H-63/Mackinac Trail) The trunkline became part of M-28. In early 1942, M-28 was rerouted on the current alignment south of Brimley and this highway was turned back to local control. In 1945, M-221 was designated along a portion of the former M-28.

Major intersections

See also

References

External links

M-221 at Michigan Highways

221
Transportation in Chippewa County, Michigan